Huilong is a town of Deqing County in western Guangdong province, China, situated on the northern (left) bank of the Xi River  northwest of the county seat along China National Highway 321. , it has one residential community and nine villages under its administration.

See also
List of township-level divisions of Guangdong

References

Towns in Guangdong
Zhaoqing